Karl Helm (full name Karl Hermann Georg Helm, born 19 May 1871 in Karlsruhe, died 9 September 1960 in Marburg) was a German philologist who specialized in Germanic studies

Biography
Karl Helm was born in Karlsruhe, Germany on 19 May 1871. He studied German philology in Heidelberg and Freiburg, earning his doctorate in 1895 with a study on 16th-century poetry.

Helm's habilitation was on the literature surrounding the Teutonic Order, published 1899 in Giessen. After teaching in Giesen, Würzburg and Frankfurt, he received tenure in Marburg as professor for early Germanic philology (Altgermanistik) in 1921.

Helm took over editorship of the Althochdeutsche Grammatik, Althochdeutsches Lesebuch and Gotische Grammatik from Wilhelm Braune, all standard works in Germanic studies. His own research focused on Middle High German, Old High German, Germanic folklore and religion. students of Helm include Karl Bischoff, Hans Kuhn, Nechama Leibowitz, Eduard Neumann and Jost Trier.

Helm adhered to a national conservative ideology throughout his life, expressing sympathy for the German National People's Party (without however becoming a regular member). He was a member of the Militant League for German Culture from 1933, but he never became a member of the Nazi party. In November 1933 Helm signed the Vow of allegiance of the Professors of the German Universities and High-Schools to Adolf Hitler and the National Socialistic State.

Helm retired from Marburg as professor emeritus in 1936, but continued hold lectures there until 1958. He died in Marburg on 9 September 1960.

Selected works
 Zur Rhythmik der kurzen Reimpaare des 16. Jahrhunderts, 1895
 (Publisher) Das Evangelium Nicodemi, 1902
 (Publisher) Dichtungen des Deutschen Ordens. 1: Die Apokalypse Heinrichs von Hesler: aus der Danziger Handschrift, 1907
 Altgermanische Religionsgeschichte, 1913
 Altgermanische Religionsgeschichte. 2: Die nachrömische Zeit; Teil 1: Die Ostgermanen, 1937
 Die Literatur des Deutschen Ritterordens, 1951
 Altgermanische Religionsgeschichte. 2: Die nachrömische Zeit; Teil 2: Die Westgermanen, 1953

See also
 Rudolf Much
 Andreas Heusler
 Eugen Mogk
 Otto Höfler

References

Sources 
 Peter Wengel: Karl Helm. In: Internationales Germanistenlexikon 1800-1950, eds. König, Wägenbaur, Frindt, vol. 1, Walter de Gruyter, Berlin – New York 2003. .
 Bernhard Maier: Karl Helm, In: Heinrich Beck, Dieter Geuenich, Heiko Steuer (eds.): Reallexikon der Germanischen Altertumskunde, vol.14, Berlin – New York 1999, 
 
 Deutsche Biographische Enzyklopädie, 1996.

External links
 
 Karl Helm in the OPAC of Regesta Imperii

German medievalists
Germanic studies scholars
Linguists of Germanic languages
Germanists
Militant League for German Culture members
Pagan studies scholars
1871 births
1960 deaths
German male non-fiction writers
Writers on Germanic paganism